Rod Laver defeated Roy Emerson 6–2, 6–4, 5–7, 6–4 in the final to win the men's singles tennis title at the 1962 U.S. National Championships, and in turn complete a Grand Slam by winning all four majors in the same year. Laver would not appear in a Grand Slam tournament again until the start of the Open Era in 1968, due to turning professional in 1963.

Seeds
The seeded players are listed below. Rod Laver is the champion; others show the round in which they were eliminated.

 Rod Laver (champion)
 Roy Emerson (finalist)
 Chuck McKinley (semifinals)
 Rafael Osuna (semifinals)
 Fred Stolle (second round)
 Jan-Erik Lundqvist (third round)
 Nicola Pietrangeli (first round)
 Frank Froehling (quarterfinals)

Draw

Key
 Q = Qualifier
 WC = Wild card
 LL = Lucky loser
 r = Retired

Finals

Earlier rounds

Section 1

Section 2

Section 3

Section 4

Section 5

Section 6

Section 7

Section 8

References

External links
 1962 U.S. National Championships on ITFtennis.com, the source for this draw
 Association of Tennis Professionals (ATP) – 1962 U.S. Championships Men's Singles draw

U.S. National Championships (tennis) by year – Men's singles
Mens Singles